Igor Yuryevich Gorelov (born 8 March 1969) is a Russian professional football coach and a former player. He is the manager of Russian Amateur Football League club FC Lokomotiv-RPM Nizhny Novgorod.

Club career
He made his professional debut in the Soviet Second League in 1986 for FC Khimik Dzerzhinsk.

Honours
 Russian Premier League champion: 1995.

References

1969 births
Living people
Soviet footballers
Russian footballers
Association football defenders
FC Khimik Dzerzhinsk players
FC Lokomotiv Nizhny Novgorod players
FC Spartak Vladikavkaz players
FC Tyumen players
FC Torpedo NN Nizhny Novgorod players
FC Zhemchuzhina Sochi players
FC Kuban Krasnodar players
Russian Premier League players
Russian football managers